Date and time notation in Africa describes how date and time are counted all over the African continent and nations

East Africa

Time
For multi-lingual speakers in East Africa, the convention is to use the time system applicable to the language one happens to be speaking at the time.  A person speaking of an early morning event in English would report that it happened at eight o'clock. However, in repeating the same facts in Swahili, one would state that the events occurred at saa mbili ('two hours').

The Ganda form, ssawa bbiri, is equivalent to the Swahili in that it means literally 'two hours'.

See also 
Date and time representation by country

References 

African society
Date and time representation